Arvid Emanuelsson (25 December 1913 – 19 March 1980) was a Swedish footballer. He competed in the men's tournament at the 1936 Summer Olympics. He won 35 caps for the Sweden national team and scored one goal between 1935 and 1946.

References

External links
 

1913 births
1980 deaths
Swedish footballers
Sweden international footballers
Allsvenskan players
IF Elfsborg players
Olympic footballers of Sweden
Footballers at the 1936 Summer Olympics
People from Borås
Association football midfielders
Sportspeople from Västra Götaland County